Rapahanadosis is the second album by British hardcore punk band Dr and The Crippens.

The album cover features the legend 'Snit,' leading some people to believe the album title was actually Snit; indeed, a live video recorded at the Fulham Greyhound, London, was entitled Live Snit.

Track listing
 Garden Centre Murders - 2:22
 Bench - 0:18
 Braindead - 1:46
 Zombies In Disneyland - 2:08
 Epic - 0:08
 The Elvis Shroud - 1:52
 Enter The Garden - 2:12
 I'm So Dumb - 1:15
 G-Plan 9 From Outer Space - 3:27
 My Brother Is A Headcase - 1:49
 Henenlotter - 1:22
 Anti-Christ On Button Moon - 3:12
 Kid With The Removable Face - 1:40
 Greenfinger - 1:55
 Fire Prevention - 0:18
 Song For Guy - 2:36
 Skintight - 2:13
 8 Years In Office - 0:05
 Jimmy Goes To Egypt - 1:08
 Podbreath - 1:32
 Extreme Noise T - 0:23
 Nightmare On Sesame Street - 3:20

Extended CD version (John Peel Session bonus tracks)

 Pink Machine Gun - 1:26
 The Ballad Of Farmer Vincent - 1:48
 Garden Centre Murders - 1:52
 Peely Backwards - 1:22
 Skintight (Peel Session Version) - 2:22
 Ode To A Slug - 0:53
 Pneumatic Geek - 2:21
 Death Squad - 1:45
 Jimmy Goes To Egypt (Peel Session Version) - 0:57
 Don't Look In The Freezer - 1:25
 Mindsurf - 02:02
 Experiment Conclusion - 0:09

Personnel
Wayne Crippenski - Bass, Vocals
Jesus Van Gogh - Drums, Backing Vocals
Tom Crippen - Guitar, Backing Vocals
Max Von Reinhead - Vocals

Produced by Doctor And The Crippens and Mr. Soots

References 

1989 albums
Dr and The Crippens albums
Manic Ears Records albums